In measure theory, a field of mathematics, the Hausdorff density measures how concentrated a Radon measure is at some point.

Definition 

Let  be a Radon measure and  some point in Euclidean space. The s-dimensional upper and lower Hausdorff densities are defined to be, respectively, 

and

where  is the ball of radius r > 0 centered at a. Clearly,  for all .

Marstrand's theorem 

The following theorem states that the times when the s-density exists are rather seldom.

Suppose that the s-density  exists and is positive and finite for a in a set of positive  measure. Then s is an integer.

Preiss' theorem 

In 1987 David Preiss proved a stronger version of Marstrand's theorem. One consequence is that sets with positive and finite density are rectifiable sets.

Then  is m-rectifiable, i.e.

External links
 Density of a set at Encyclopedia of Mathematics
 Rectifiable set at Encyclopedia of Mathematics

References 
 Pertti Mattila, Geometry of sets and measures in Euclidean spaces. Cambridge Press, 1995.
 

Measure theory